Miñano Menor in Spanish or Miñao Gutxia (Miñaogutxi) in Basque is a village in Álava, Basque Country, Spain.

Populated places in Álava